Leroy Coggins (1932–2013) was a virologist who developed tests for African swine fever and equine infectious anemia. The latter is now known as the Coggins Test and a "negative Coggins" is commonly required when horses are sold or transported in the US.

Originally from North Carolina, Coggins studied at Oklahoma State University and in 1962 he completed a PhD at Cornell University's College of Veterinary Medicine. He went on to create the Coggins Test at Cornell, and it was approved for use in 1973. Coggins later became a department chair at the North Carolina State University College of Veterinary Medicine.

References

1932 births
2013 deaths
American virologists
North Carolina State University faculty